

Events

Pre-1600
 960 – Battle of Andrassos: Byzantines under Leo Phokas the Younger score a crushing victory over the Hamdanid Emir of Aleppo, Sayf al-Dawla.
1278 – Trần Thánh Tông, the second emperor of the Trần dynasty, decides to pass the throne to his crown prince Trần Khâm and take up the post of Retired Emperor.
1291 – The Republic of Venice enacts a law confining most of Venice's glassmaking industry to the "island of Murano".
1519 – Hernán Cortés enters Tenochtitlán and Aztec ruler Moctezuma welcomes him with a great celebration. 
1520 – Stockholm Bloodbath begins: A successful invasion of Sweden by Danish forces results in the execution of around 100 people, mostly noblemen.
1576 – Eighty Years' War: Pacification of Ghent: The States General of the Netherlands meet and unite to oppose Spanish occupation.

1601–1900
1602 – The Bodleian Library at the University of Oxford is opened to the public.
1605 – Robert Catesby, ringleader of the Gunpowder Plotters, is killed.
1614 – Japanese daimyō Dom Justo Takayama is exiled to the Philippines by shōgun Tokugawa Ieyasu for being Christian.
1620 – The Battle of White Mountain takes place near Prague, ending in a decisive Catholic victory in only two hours.
1644 – The Shunzhi Emperor, the third emperor of the Qing dynasty, is enthroned in Beijing after the collapse of the Ming dynasty as the first Qing emperor to rule over China.
1745 – Charles Edward Stuart invades England with an army of approximately 5,000 that would later participate in the Battle of Culloden.
1837 – Mary Lyon founds Mount Holyoke Female Seminary, which later becomes Mount Holyoke College.
1861 – American Civil War: The "Trent Affair": The  stops the British mail ship Trent and arrests two Confederate envoys, sparking a diplomatic crisis between the UK and US.
1889 – Montana is admitted as the 41st U.S. state.
1892 – The New Orleans general strike begins, uniting black and white American trade unionists in a successful four-day general strike action for the first time.
1895 – While experimenting with electricity, Wilhelm Röntgen discovers the X-ray.

1901–present
1901 – Gospel riots: Bloody clashes take place in Athens following the translation of the Gospels into demotic Greek.
1917 – The first Council of People's Commissars is formed, including Vladimir Lenin, Leon Trotsky and Joseph Stalin.
1919 – Eichenfeld massacre: Members of the Revolutionary Insurgent Army of Ukraine murder 136 Mennonite colonists at Jaskyowo, initiating a series of massacres that resulted in the deaths of 827 Ukrainian Mennonites.
1920 - Rupert Bear, illustrated by Mary Tourtel makes his first appearance in print. 
1923 – Beer Hall Putsch: In Munich, Adolf Hitler leads the Nazis in an unsuccessful attempt to overthrow the German government.
1932 – Franklin D. Roosevelt is elected as the 32nd President of the United States, defeating incumbent president Herbert Hoover.
1933 – Great Depression: New Deal: US President Franklin D. Roosevelt unveils the Civil Works Administration, an organization designed to create jobs for more than four million unemployed. 
1936 – Spanish Civil War: Francoist troops fail in their effort to capture Madrid, but begin the three-year Siege of Madrid afterwards.
1937 – The Nazi exhibition Der ewige Jude ("The Eternal Jew") opens in Munich.
1939 – Venlo Incident: Two British agents of SIS are captured by the Germans.
  1939   – In Munich, Adolf Hitler narrowly escapes the assassination attempt of Georg Elser while celebrating the 16th anniversary of the Beer Hall Putsch.
1940 – Greco-Italian War: The Italian invasion of Greece fails as outnumbered Greek units repulse the Italians in the Battle of Elaia–Kalamas.
1942 – World War II: French Resistance coup in Algiers, in which 400 civilian French patriots neutralize Vichyist XIXth Army Corps after 15 hours of fighting, and arrest several Vichyist generals, allowing the immediate success of Operation Torch in Algiers.
1950 – Korean War: United States Air Force Lt. Russell J. Brown, while piloting an F-80 Shooting Star, shoots down two North Korean MiG-15s in the first jet aircraft-to-jet aircraft dogfight in history.
1957 – Pan Am Flight 7 disappears between San Francisco and Honolulu. Wreckage and bodies are discovered a week later.
  1957   – Operation Grapple X, Round C1: The United Kingdom conducts its first successful hydrogen bomb test over Kiritimati in the Pacific.
1960 – John F. Kennedy is elected as the 35th President of the United States, defeating incumbent Vice President Richard Nixon, who would later be elected president in 1968  and 1972.
1963 – Finnair's Aero Flight 217 crashes near Mariehamn Airport in Jomala, Åland, killing 22 people.
1965 – The British Indian Ocean Territory is created, consisting of Chagos Archipelago, Aldabra, Farquhar and Des Roches islands.
  1965   – The Murder (Abolition of Death Penalty) Act 1965 is given Royal Assent, formally abolishing the death penalty in the United Kingdom for almost all crimes.
  1965   – The 173rd Airborne is ambushed by over 1,200 Viet Cong in Operation Hump during the Vietnam War, while the 1st Battalion, Royal Australian Regiment fight one of the first set-piece engagements of the war between Australian forces and the Viet Cong at the Battle of Gang Toi.
  1965   – American Airlines Flight 383 crashes in Constance, Kentucky, killing 58.
1966 – Former Massachusetts Attorney General Edward Brooke becomes the first African American elected to the United States Senate since Reconstruction.
  1966   – U.S. President Lyndon B. Johnson signs into law an antitrust exemption allowing the National Football League to merge with the upstart American Football League. 
1968 – The Vienna Convention on Road Traffic is signed to facilitate international road traffic and to increase road safety by standardising the uniform traffic rules among the signatories.
1972 – American pay television network Home Box Office (HBO) launches.
1973 – The right ear of John Paul Getty III is delivered to a newspaper outlet along with a ransom note, convincing his father to pay US$2.9 million.
1977 – Manolis Andronikos, a Greek archaeologist and professor at the Aristotle University of Thessaloniki, discovers the tomb of Philip II of Macedon at Vergina.
1981 – Aeroméxico Flight 110 crashes near Zihuatanejo, Mexico, killing all 18 people on board.
1983 – TAAG Angola Airlines Flight 462 crashes after takeoff from Lubango Airport killing all 130 people on board. UNITA claims to have shot down the aircraft, though this is disputed.
1987 – Remembrance Day bombing: A Provisional IRA bomb explodes in Enniskillen, Northern Ireland during a ceremony honouring those who had died in wars involving British forces. Twelve people are killed and sixty-three wounded.
1988 – U.S. Vice President George H. W. Bush is elected as the 41st president.
1994 – Republican Revolution: On the night of the 1994 United States midterm elections, Republicans make historic electoral gains by securing massive majorities in both houses of Congress (54 seats in the House and eight seats in the Senate, additionally), thus bringing to a close four decades of Democratic domination.
1999 – Bruce Miller is killed at his junkyard near Flint, Michigan. His wife Sharee Miller, who convinced her online lover Jerry Cassaday to kill him (before later killing himself) was convicted of the crime, in what became the world's first Internet murder.
2002 – Iraq disarmament crisis: UN Security Council Resolution 1441: The United Nations Security Council unanimously approves a resolution on Iraq, forcing Saddam Hussein to disarm or face "serious consequences".
2004 – Iraq War: More than 10,000 U.S. troops and a small number of Iraqi army units participate in a siege on the insurgent stronghold of Fallujah.
2006 – Israeli-Palestinian conflict: The Israeli Defense Force kill 19 Palestinian civilians in their homes during the shelling of Beit Hanoun.
2011 – The potentially hazardous asteroid 2005 YU55 passes 0.85 lunar distances from Earth (about ), the closest known approach by an asteroid of its brightness since  in 1976.
2013 – Typhoon Haiyan, one of the strongest tropical cyclones ever recorded, strikes the Visayas region of the Philippines; the storm left at least 6,340 people dead with over 1,000 still missing, and caused $2.86 billion (2013 USD) in damage.
2016 – Indian Prime Minister Narendra Modi publicly announces the withdrawal of ₹500 and ₹1000 denomination banknotes.
  2016   – Donald Trump is elected the 45th President of the United States, defeating Hillary Clinton, the first woman ever to receive a major party's nomination.
  2020 - Myanmar holds the 2020 general election, re-electing a government led by the National League for Democracy, which is deposed by the Burmese military the following February during the 2021 Myanmar coup d'état.

Births

Pre-1600
AD 30 – Nerva, Roman emperor (d. 98)
1407 – Alain de Coëtivy, French cardinal (d. 1474)
1417 – Philipp I, Count of Hanau-Lichtenberg (1458–1480) (d. 1480)
1456 – Queen Gonghye, Korean royal consort (d. 1474)
1491 – Teofilo Folengo, Italian monk and poet (d. 1544)
1543 – Lettice Knollys, Countess of Essex and lady-in-waiting to Elizabeth I of England  (d. 1634)
1555 – Nyaungyan Min, King of Burma (d. 1605)
1563 – Henry II, Duke of Lorraine (d. 1624)
1572 – John Sigismund, Elector of Brandenburg (d. 1619)

1601–1900
1622 – Charles X Gustav of Sweden (d. 1660)
1656 – Edmond Halley, English astronomer and mathematician (d. 1742)
1706 – Johann Ulrich von Cramer, German philosopher and judge (d. 1772)
1710 – Sarah Fielding, English author (d. 1768)
1715 – Elisabeth Christine of Brunswick-Wolfenbüttel-Bevern (d. 1797)
1723 – John Byron, English admiral and politician, 24th Commodore Governor of Newfoundland (d. 1786)
1725 – Johann George Tromlitz, German flute player and composer (d. 1805)
1738 – Barbara Catharina Mjödh, Finnish poet (d. 1776)
1763 – Otto Wilhelm Masing, German-Estonian linguist and author (d. 1832)
1768 – Princess Augusta Sophia of the United Kingdom (d. 1840)
1772 – William Wirt, American lawyer and politician, 9th United States Attorney General (d. 1834)
1788 – Mihály Bertalanits, Slovene poet and educator (d. 1853)
1831 – Robert Bulwer-Lytton, 1st Earl of Lytton, English poet and diplomat, 30th Governor-General of India (d. 1880)
1836 – Milton Bradley, American businessman, founded the Milton Bradley Company (d. 1911)
1837 – Ilia Chavchavadze, Georgian journalist, lawyer, and politician (d. 1907)
1847 – Jean Casimir-Perier, French politician, 6th President of France (d. 1907)
  1847   – Bram Stoker, Irish novelist and critic, created Count Dracula (d. 1912)
1848 – Gottlob Frege, German mathematician and philosopher (d. 1925)
1854 – Johannes Rydberg, Swedish physicist and academic (d. 1919)
1855 – Nikolaos Triantafyllakos, Greek politician, Prime Minister of Greece (d. 1939)
1866 – Herbert Austin, 1st Baron Austin, English businessman, founded the Austin Motor Company (d. 1941)
1868 – Felix Hausdorff, German mathematician and academic (d. 1942)
1878 – Dorothea Bate, English palaeontologist and archaeozoologist (d. 1951)
1881 – Clarence Gagnon, Canadian painter and illustrator (d. 1942)
1883 – Arnold Bax, English composer and poet (d. 1953)
  1883   – Charles Demuth, American painter (d. 1935)
1884 – Hermann Rorschach, Swiss psychiatrist and psychoanalyst (d. 1922)
1885 – George Bouzianis, Greek painter (d. 1959)
  1885   – Hans Cloos, German geologist and academic (d. 1951)
  1885   – Emil Fahrenkamp, German architect and academic (d. 1966)
  1885   – Tomoyuki Yamashita, Japanese general and politician, 4th Japanese Military Governors of the Philippines (d. 1946)
1888 – David Monrad Johansen, Norwegian pianist and composer (d. 1974)
  1888   – Nestor Makhno, Ukrainian anarchist revolutionary (d. 1934)
1893 – Prajadhipok, Thai king (d. 1941)
1896 – Erika Abels d'Albert, Austrian painter and graphic artist (d. 1975)
  1896   – Bucky Harris, American baseball player and manager (d. 1977)
  1896   – Marie Prevost, Canadian-American actress and singer (d. 1937)
1897 – Dorothy Day, American journalist and activist (d. 1980)
1900 – Margaret Mitchell, American journalist and author (d. 1949)

1901–present
1902 – A. J. M. Smith, Canadian poet and anthologist (d. 1980)
1904 – Cedric Belfrage, English-American journalist and author, co-founded the National Guardian (d. 1990)
1908 – Martha Gellhorn, American journalist and author (d. 1998)
1910 – James McCormack, American general (d. 1975)
1911 – Al Brosch, American golfer (d. 1975)
  1911   – Robert Jackson, Australian public servant and diplomat (d. 1991)
1912 – June Havoc, American actress, singer and dancer (d. 2010)
  1912   – Stylianos Pattakos, Greek general and politician, Deputy Prime Minister of Greece (d. 2016)
1913 – Lou Ambers, American boxer (d. 1995)
1914 – Norman Lloyd, American actor, director, and producer (d. 2021)
1918 – Kazuo Sakamaki, Japanese soldier (d. 1999)
  1918   – Hermann Zapf, German typographer and calligrapher (d. 2015)
1919 – James S. Ackerman, American historian and academic (d. 2016) 
1920 – Sitara Devi, Indian actress, dancer, and choreographer (d. 2014)
  1920   – Esther Rolle, American actress (d. 1998)
  1920   – Eugênio Sales, Brazilian cardinal (d. 2012)
1921 – Douglas Townsend, American composer, musicologist, and academic (d. 2012)
1922 – Christiaan Barnard, South African surgeon and academic (d. 2001)
  1922   – Thea D. Hodge, American computer scientist and academic (d. 2008)
  1922   – Ademir Marques de Menezes, Brazilian footballer, coach, and sportscaster (d. 1996)
1923 – Yisrael Friedman, Romanian-born Israeli rabbi (d. 2017)
  1923   – Jack Kilby, American physicist and engineer, Nobel Prize laureate (d. 2005)
1924 – Johnny Bower, Canadian ice hockey player and soldier (d. 2017)
  1924   – Joe Flynn, American actor (d. 1974)
  1924   – Robert V. Hogg, American statistician and academic (d. 2014)
  1924   – Victorinus Youn Kong-hi, South Korean archbishop
  1924   – Dmitry Yazov, Marshal of the Soviet Union (d. 2020)
1926 – Darleane C. Hoffman, American nuclear chemist
1927 – L. K. Advani, Indian lawyer and politician, 7th Deputy Prime Minister of India
  1927   – Ken Dodd, English singer and comedian (d. 2018)
  1927   – Chris Connor, American singer (d. 2009)
  1927   – Nguyễn Khánh, Vietnamese general and politician, 4th President of the Republic of Vietnam (d. 2013)
  1927   – Patti Page, American singer and actress (d. 2013)
1928 – Des Corcoran, Australian politician, 37th Premier of South Australia (d. 2004)
1929 – Bobby Bowden, American football player and coach (d. 2021)
  1929   – António Castanheira Neves, Portuguese philosopher and academic
1931 – Jim Redman, English-Rhodesian motorcycle racer
  1931   – Morley Safer, Canadian-American journalist and author (d. 2016) 
  1931   – Paolo Taviani, Italian film director and screenwriter
1932 – Stéphane Audran, French actress (d. 2018)
  1932   – Ben Bova, American journalist and author (d. 2020)
1933 – Peter Arundell, English race car driver (d. 2009)
1935 – Alain Delon, French-Swiss actor, producer, screenwriter
  1935   – Stratos Dionysiou, Greek singer-songwriter (d. 1990)
  1935   – Alfonso López Trujillo, Colombian cardinal (d. 2008)
1936 – Virna Lisi, Italian actress (d. 2014)
1938 – Driss Basri, Moroccan police officer and politician (d. 2007)
  1938   – Satch Sanders, American basketball player
  1938   – Richard Stoker, English composer, author, and poet (d. 2021)
1939 – Meg Wynn Owen, Welsh actress
1941 – Nerys Hughes, Welsh actress
1942 – Angel Cordero Jr., Puerto Rican-American jockey
  1942   – Sandro Mazzola, Italian footballer and sportscaster
1943 – Martin Peters, English footballer and manager (d. 2019)
1944 – Bonnie Bramlett, American singer and actress 
1945 – Arduino Cantafora, Italian-Swiss architect, painter, and author
  1945   – Joseph James DeAngelo, American serial killer 
  1945   – John Farrar, Australian-born music producer, songwriter, arranger, singer, and guitarist
  1945   – Don Murray, American drummer (d. 1996)
  1945   – Vincent Nichols, English cardinal 
  1945   – Arnold Rosner, American composer (d. 2013)
1946 – Guus Hiddink, Dutch footballer and manager
  1946   – Roy Wood, English singer-songwriter, guitarist, and producer 
1947 – Michael Perham, English bishop (d. 2017)
  1947   – Minnie Riperton, American singer-songwriter (d. 1979)
  1947   – Margaret Rhea Seddon, American physician and astronaut
  1947   – Lewis Yocum, American physician and surgeon (d. 2013)
1948 – Dale Gardner, American captain and astronaut (d. 2014)
1949 – Wayne LaPierre, American businessman, author, and activist
  1949   – Bonnie Raitt, American singer-songwriter and guitarist
1950 – Mary Hart, American journalist and actress
1951 – Gerald Alston, American R&B singer
  1951   – Larry Burnett, American singer-songwriter and guitarist
  1951   – Alfredo Astiz, Argentinian captain
  1951   – Laura Cox, English lawyer and judge
  1951   – Peter Suber, American philosopher and academic 
1952 – John Denny, American baseball player and coach
  1952   – Christie Hefner, American publisher and businesswoman
  1952   – Jan Raas, Dutch cyclist
  1952   – Jerry Remy, American baseball player and sportscaster (d. 2021)
  1952   – Alfre Woodard, American actress 
1953 – Giorgos Foiros, Greek footballer and manager
  1953   – John Musker, American animator, director, producer, and screenwriter
  1953   – Nand Kumar Patel, Indian politician (d. 2013)
1954 – David Bret, French-English journalist and author
  1954   – Michael D. Brown, American lawyer and radio host
  1954   – Timothy Egan, American journalist and author 
  1954   – Kazuo Ishiguro, Japanese-British novelist, screenwriter, and short story writer.
  1954   – Rickie Lee Jones, American singer-songwriter and producer
  1954   – Thanasis Pafilis, Greek jurist and politician 
1955 – Patricia Barber, American singer-songwriter and pianist
  1955   – Jeffrey Ford, American author and educator
1956 – Mari Boine, Norwegian singer-songwriter and producer
  1956   – Richard Curtis, New Zealand-English screenwriter, film and television producer, and film director
  1956   – Steven Miller, American record producer and engineer
1957 – Alan Curbishley, English footballer and manager
  1957   – Tim Shaw, American swimmer
  1957   – Porl Thompson, English guitarist and songwriter 
  1957   – Hardi Volmer, Estonian singer and director 
1958 – Don Byron, American clarinet player and composer
  1958   – Ken Lamberton, American author and educator
  1958   – Selçuk Yula, Turkish footballer and journalist (d. 2013)
1959 – Miroslav Janů, Czech footballer and manager (d. 2013)
  1959   – Chi Chi LaRue, American drag queen performer and director
1960 – Oleg Menshikov, Russian actor, singer, and director
  1960   – Michael Nyqvist, Swedish actor and producer (d. 2017)
1961 – Micky Adams, English footballer and manager
  1961   – Leif Garrett, American singer, actor, and television personality
1963 – Paul McKenna, English hypnotist and author
1965 – Jeff Blauser, American baseball player and manager
  1965   – Craig Chester, American actor and screenwriter
  1965   – Mike Matarazzo, American bodybuilder and boxer (d. 2014)
  1965   – Patricia Poleo, Venezuelan journalist
1966 – Gordon Ramsay, British chef, restaurateur, and television host/personality
1967 – Henry Rodriguez, Dominican baseball player
  1967   – Courtney Thorne-Smith, American actress 
1968 – Keith Jones, Canadian ice hockey player and sportscaster
  1968   – José Offerman, Dominican baseball player and manager
  1968   – Sergio Porrini, Italian footballer and manager
  1968   – Parker Posey, American actress 
1970 – Tom Anderson, American businessman, co-founded Myspace
  1970   – David Hemp, Bermudian cricketer
  1970   – Michael Jackson, Canadian actor
  1970   – Diana King, Jamaican singer-songwriter
  1970   – José Porras, Costa Rican footballer and coach
1971 – Carlos Atanes, Spanish director, producer, and screenwriter
  1971   – Tech N9ne, American musician, record producer, and actor
1972 – Chris Fydler, Australian swimmer
  1972   – Gretchen Mol, American model and actress
  1972   – Kylie Shadbolt, Australian artistic gymnast
1973 – Sven Mikser, Estonian politician, 22nd Estonian Minister of Defence
  1973   – David Muir, American journalist
1974 – Joshua Ferris, American author
  1974   – Penelope Heyns, South African swimmer
  1974   – Masashi Kishimoto, Japanese author and illustrator, created Naruto
  1974   – Seishi Kishimoto, Japanese illustrator
1975 – Brevin Knight, American basketball player and sportscaster
  1975   – Tara Reid, American actress
  1975   – Alena Vašková, Czech tennis player
1976 – Brett Lee, Australian cricketer and sportscaster
  1976   – Colin Strause, American director, producer, and visual effects designer
1977 – Jully Black, Canadian singer-songwriter, producer, and actress
  1977   – Bucky Covington, American singer-songwriter and guitarist
  1977   – Nick Punto, American baseball player
1978 – Moses Michael Levi Barrow (born Jamal Michael Barrow), better known by his stage name Shyne, Belizean rapper and politician
  1978   – Matthew Bulbeck, English cricketer
  1978   – Tim de Cler, Dutch footballer
  1978   – Maurice Evans, American basketball player
  1978   – Ali Karimi, Iranian footballer and manager
  1978   – Kensaku Kishida, Japanese actor and entertainer
  1978   – Emma Lewell-Buck, English social worker and politician
  1978   – Júlio Sérgio, Brazilian footballer and manager
1979 – Andrea Benatti, Italian rugby player
  1979   – Aaron Hughes, Irish footballer
1980 – Luís Fabiano, Brazilian footballer
  1980   – Laura Jane Grace, American singer-songwriter, guitarist, and producer 
  1980   – Holly Walsh, English radio and television host
1981 – Joe Cole, English footballer
  1981   – Yann Kermorgant, French footballer
1982 – Ted DiBiase, Jr., American wrestler and actor
  1982   – Mika Kallio, Finnish motorcycle racer
  1982   – Sam Sparro, Australian singer-songwriter and producer
1983 – Sinan Güler, Turkish basketball player
  1983   – Katharina Molitor, German javelin thrower
  1983   – Remko Pasveer, Dutch footballer
  1983   – Pavel Pogrebnyak, Russian footballer
  1983   – Nikola Rachelle, English-New Zealand singer-songwriter and producer
  1983   – Danielle Valore Evans, American short story writer
1984 – Kuntal Chandra, Bangladeshi cricketer (d. 2012)
  1984   – Yoko Mitsuya, Japanese model and actress
  1984   – Steven Webb, English actor
1985 – Magda Apanowicz, Canadian actress
  1985   – Míchel, Spanish footballer
1986 – Patricia Mayr-Achleitner, Austrian tennis player
  1986   – Jamie Roberts, Welsh rugby player
  1986   – Aaron Swartz, American computer programmer and activist (d. 2013)
1987 – Édgar Benítez, Paraguayan footballer
  1987   – Sam Bradford, American football player 
  1987   – Mohd Faiz Subri, Malaysian footballer 
1988 – Jessica Lowndes, Canadian actress and singer
  1988   – Lucia Slaničková, Slovak heptathlete
1989 – Morgan Schneiderlin, French footballer
  1989   – Giancarlo Stanton, American baseball player
1990 – Ingrid Puusta, Estonian sailor
  1990   – SZA, American singer-songwriter
1991 – Aaron Fotheringham, American wheelchair athlete
  1991   – Jack Littlejohn, Australian rugby league player
  1991   – Dan Middleton, English YouTube personality and pro gamer
1992 – Christophe Vincent, French footballer
1993 – Przemek Karnowski, Polish basketball player
  1993   – Fraser Mullen, Scottish footballer
1999 – Katherine Uchida, Canadian rhythmic gymnast
2000 – Jasmine Thompson, English singer

Deaths

Pre-1600
 397 – Martin of Tours, Frankish bishop and saint
 618 – Adeodatus I, pope of the Catholic Church
 785 – Sawara, Japanese prince 
 789 – Willehad, bishop of Bremen
 928 – Duan Ning, Chinese general
 940 – Yao Yi, Chinese chancellor (b. 866)
 943 – Liu, empress of Qi (Ten Kingdoms) (b. 877)
 955 – Agapetus II, pope of the Catholic Church
 977 – Ibn al-Qūṭiyya, Andalusian historian
1067 – Sancha of León, Queen of León (b. c. 1018)
1115 – Godfrey of Amiens, French bishop and saint (b. 1066)
1122 – Ilghazi, Artuqid ruler of Mardin
1171 – Baldwin IV, Count of Hainaut (b. 1108)
1195 – Conrad, Count Palatine of the Rhine (b. 1135)
1226 – Louis VIII, king of France (b. 1187) 
1246 – Berengaria of Castile (b. 1179)
1263 – Matilda of Béthune, French countess
1308 – Duns Scotus, Scottish priest, philosopher, and academic (b. 1266)
1400 – Peter of Aragon, Aragonese infante (b. 1398)
1478 – Baeda Maryam I, emperor of Ethiopia (b. 1448)
1494 – Melozzo da Forlì, Italian painter (b. c. 1438)
1517 – Francisco Jiménez de Cisneros, Spanish cardinal (b. 1436)
1527 – Jerome Emser, German theologian and reformer (b. 1477)
1599 – Francisco Guerrero, Spanish composer (b. 1528)
1600 – Natsuka Masaie, Japanese daimyō (b. 1562)

1601–1900
1605 – Robert Catesby, English conspirator, leader of the Gunpowder Plot (b. 1573)
1606 – Girolamo Mercuriale, Italian philologist and physician (b. 1530)
1658 – Witte de With, Dutch admiral (b. 1599)
1674 – John Milton, English poet and philosopher (b. 1608)
1719 – Michel Rolle, French mathematician and author (b. 1652)
1773 – Friedrich Wilhelm von Seydlitz, Prussian general (b. 1721)
1817 – Andrea Appiani, Italian painter and educator (b. 1754)
1828 – Thomas Bewick, English engraver, illustrator and author (b.1753)
1830 – Francis I of the Two Sicilies (b. 1777)
1873 – Manuel Bretón de los Herreros, Spanish poet, playwright, and critic (b. 1796)
1887 – Doc Holliday, American dentist and poker player (b. 1851)
1890 – César Franck, Belgian organist and composer (b. 1822)
1895 – Robert Battey, American surgeon and academic (b. 1828)

1901–present
1901 – James Agnew, Irish-Australian politician, 16th Premier of Tasmania (b. 1815)
1905 – Victor Borisov-Musatov, Russian painter (b. 1870)
1917 – Colin Blythe, English cricketer and soldier (b. 1879)
1921 – Pavol Országh Hviezdoslav, Slovak poet and playwright (b. 1849)
1934 – Carlos Chagas, Brazilian physician and bacteriologist (b. 1879)
1944 – Walter Nowotny, Austrian-German soldier and pilot (b. 1920)
1945 – August von Mackensen, German field marshal (b. 1849)
1949 – Cyriel Verschaeve, Belgian-Austrian priest and activist (b. 1874)
1953 – Ivan Bunin, Russian author and poet, Nobel Prize laureate (b. 1870)
  1953   – John van Melle, Dutch-South African author and educator (b. 1887)
1956 – Chika Kuroda, Japanese chemist (b. 1884)
1959 – Frank S. Land, American activist, founded the DeMolay International (b. 1890)
1960 – Subroto Mukerjee, Indian soldier; Chief of the Air Staff of the Indian Air Force (b. 1911)
1965 – Dorothy Kilgallen, American journalist, television personality, and game show panelist (b. 1913)
1968 – Wendell Corey, American actor and politician (b. 1914)
  1968   – Peter Mohr Dam, Faroese educator and politician, 3rd Prime Minister of the Faroe Islands (b. 1898)
1970 – Huw T. Edwards, Welsh poet and politician (b. 1892)
1973 – Faruk Nafiz Çamlıbel, Turkish poet, author, and politician (b. 1898)
1974 – Ivory Joe Hunter, American singer-songwriter and pianist (b. 1914)
1977 – Tasos Giannopoulos, Greek actor and producer (b. 1931)
  1977   – Bucky Harris, American baseball player and manager (b. 1896)
1978 – Norman Rockwell, American painter and illustrator (b. 1894)
1983 – James Booker, American singer and pianist (b. 1939)
  1983   – Mordecai Kaplan, Lithuanian-American rabbi and educator (b. 1881)
1985 – Nicolas Frantz, Luxembourger cyclist (b. 1899)
  1985   – Jacques Hnizdovsky, Ukrainian-American painter and illustrator (b. 1915)
1986 – Vyacheslav Molotov, Russian politician and diplomat, Soviet Minister of Foreign Affairs (b. 1890)
1994 – Michael O'Donoghue, American actor and screenwriter (b. 1940)
1998 – Rumer Godden, English author and poet (b. 1907)
  1998   – John Hunt, Baron Hunt, English colonel, mountaineer, and academic (b. 1910)
  1998   – Jean Marais, French actor and director (b. 1913)
1999 – Lester Bowie, American trumpet player and composer (b. 1941)
  1999   – Leon Štukelj, Slovenian gymnast and judge (b. 1898)
2001 – Aristidis Moschos, Greek santouri player and educator (b. 1930)
2002 – Jon Elia, Pakistani poet, philosopher, and scholar (b. 1931)
2003 – Bob Grant, English actor and screenwriter (b. 1932)
  2003   – C.Z. Guest, American actress, fashion designer, and author (b. 1920)
  2003   – Guy Speranza, American singer-songwriter (b. 1956)
2004 – Peter Mathers, English-Australian author and playwright (b. 1931)
2005 – Alekos Alexandrakis, Greek actor and director (b. 1928)
  2005   – David Westheimer, American soldier and author (b. 1917)
2006 – Basil Poledouris, American composer and conductor (b. 1945)
  2006   – Hannspeter Winter, Austrian physicist and academic (b. 1941) 
2007 – Aad Nuis, Dutch journalist, poet, and politician (b. 1933)
  2007   – Dulce Saguisag, Filipino politician, 10th Filipino Secretary of Social Welfare and Development (b. 1943)
  2007   – Chad Varah, English priest, founded The Samaritans (b. 1911)
2009 – Vitaly Ginzburg, Russian physicist and astrophysicist, Nobel Prize laureate (b. 1916)
2010 – Quintin Dailey, American basketball player (b. 1961)
  2010   – Jack Levine, American soldier and painter (b. 1915)
  2010   – Emilio Eduardo Massera, Argentinian admiral (b. 1925)
2011 – Heavy D, Jamaican-American rapper, producer, and actor (b. 1967)
  2011   – Bil Keane, American cartoonist (b. 1922)
2012 – Lee MacPhail, American businessman (b. 1917)
  2012   – Pete Namlook, German composer and producer (b. 1960)
  2012   – Peggy Vaughan, American author (b. 1936)
2013 – William C. Davidon, American physicist, mathematician, and academic (b. 1927)
  2013   – Penn Kimball, American journalist and academic (b. 1915)
  2013   – Arnold Rosner, American composer (b. 1945)
  2013   – Chiyoko Shimakura, Japanese singer and actress (b. 1938)
  2013   – Amanchi Venkata Subrahmanyam, Indian journalist and actor (b. 1957)
2014 – Phil Crane, American academic and politician (b. 1930)
  2014   – Luigi Gorrini, Italian soldier and pilot (b. 1917)
  2014   – Don Paul, American football player and sportscaster (b. 1925)
  2014   – Hugo Sánchez Portugal, Spanish-Mexican footballer and sportscaster (b. 1984) 
  2014   – Ernie Vandeweghe, Canadian-American basketball player and physician (b. 1928)
2015 – Rhea Chiles, American philanthropist, founded the Polk Museum of Art (b. 1930)
  2015   – Joseph Cure, American ice hockey player and actor (b. 1984)
  2015   – Rod Davies, Australian-English astronomer and academic (b. 1930)
  2015   – Om Prakash Mehra, Indian air marshal and politician (b. 1919)
  2015   – Maduluwawe Sobitha Thero, Sri Lankan monk and activist (b. 1942)
2020 – Alex Trebek, Canadian-American television personality and longtime host of Jeopardy! (b. 1940)

Holidays and observances
Christian feast day:
Saint Elizabeth of the Trinity (Roman Catholic Church) 
Four Crowned Martyrs
Godfrey of Amiens
Johann von Staupitz (Lutheran)
Blessed John Duns Scotus
Saints and Martyrs of England (Church of England)
Tysilio
Willehad of Bremen
November 8 (Eastern Orthodox liturgics)
 Intersex Day of Remembrance (New South Wales, Australia)
 International Day of Radiology (European Society of Radiology)
National Aboriginal Veterans Day (Canada)
Synaxis of the Archangel Michael and the other Bodiless Powers of Heaven (Eastern Orthodox Church)
World Urbanism Day
 Victory Day (Azerbaijan)

References

External links

 
 
 

Days of the year
November